Back Up Against the Wall is the second album by the Southern rock band Atlanta Rhythm Section, released in 1973. It is the first album to feature Ronnie Hammond on lead vocals. The album was re-released in 1977 on MCA Records as a double album with their first album (MCA-24114).

Track listing

Personnel 
Ronnie Hammond - vocals, piano
Barry Bailey - acoustic and electric guitar
J.R. Cobb - acoustic, electric, steel and slide guitars, vocals
Billy Lee Riley - harmonica
Randall Bramblett - piano
Dean Daughtry - acoustic and electric piano, organ
Al Kooper - synthesizers (including ARP)
Paul Goddard - bass
Robert Nix - drums, vocals

Production 
 Producer: Buddy Buie
 Engineers: Bobby Langford, Rodney Mills
 Mixing: Rodney Mills
 Arranger: Buddy Buie
 Cover design: Mike McCarty
 Illustrations: Mike McCarty

References

Atlanta Rhythm Section albums
1973 albums
Albums produced by Buddy Buie
Decca Records albums